Thomas Edward Kenny (October 12, 1833 – October 25, 1908) was a merchant and political figure in Nova Scotia, Canada. He represented Halifax in the House of Commons of Canada from 1887 to 1896 as a Conservative member.

He was born in Halifax, the son of Edward Kenny and Ann Forrestall, and was educated at Stonyhurst College and the Collège Saint-Servais. On his return, he entered the family dry goods business, taking over its operation around 1870. At one time, Kenny was part-owner of 18 ships; he sold his shares in several and expanded into manufacturing, becoming involved in sugar refining and cotton. In 1856, he married Margaret Jones Bourke, a descendant of the Dutch American Roosevelt and Schuyler families. He was a member of the Halifax Chamber of Commerce and president of the Merchant's Bank of Halifax (later the Royal Bank of Canada). He ran unsuccessfully for reelection to the House of Commons in 1896 and 1900. Kenny died in Halifax at the age of 75.

Electoral history

References 

 

1833 births
1908 deaths
Conservative Party of Canada (1867–1942) MPs
Members of the House of Commons of Canada from Nova Scotia
People educated at Stonyhurst College
Royal Bank of Canada presidents